Deep River may refer to:

Rivers
 The Deep River (Indiana), a tributary of the Little Calumet River in northern Indiana
 The Deep River (Iowa), a minor tributary of the English River in the United States
 The Deep River (North Carolina), in the United States
 The , a minor tributary of the Columbia River in the U.S. state of Washington
 The Deep River (Western Australia)

Places

Canada
Deep River, Ontario, a town in Renfrew County

United States
Deep River, Connecticut, a town in Middlesex County
Deep River Center, Connecticut, a census-designated place (CDP) in Middlesex County
Deep River, Indiana, an unincorporated place in Lake County
Deep River, Iowa, a city in Poweshiek County
Deep River Township, Michigan, a township in Arenac County
Deep River, Washington, a city in Washington

Other
"Deep River" (song), African American spiritual
Deep River (Hikaru Utada album), 2002
Deep River (David Murray album), 1988
Deep River (Jon Allen album), 2014
Deep River (novel), by Shusaku Endo
Deep River (film), based on the above novel and directed by Kei Kumai
Deep River, a novel by Clement Woods featuring a fictionalized character based on Gladys Bentley
Deep River Boys, American vocal group
Deep River Rock, a brand name for water produced by Coca-Cola Bottlers Ulster Ltd.
Deep River State Trail, a trail along the Deep River in North Carolina.

See also
 Deep Creek (disambiguation)
 Deep Fork River
"River Deep – Mountain High", a 1966 single by Ike & Tina Turner